Innocent Steps (lit. "Dancer’s Purity") is a 2005 South Korean film directed by Park Young-hoon. Another English title for the movie is "Dancing princess".

There's a director's cut version of the movie featuring additional 17 minutes of footage and alternative cut of the dance scene at competition.

Plot
Former acclaimed dancer Na Young-sae (Park Gun-hyung) attempts to make a comeback after his opponent, Hyun-soo (Yoon Chan), purposely injures him at a dance competition. At the suggestion of dance studio manager Ma Sang-doo (Park Won-sang), Young-sae then brings to Korea Jang Chae-ryn (Moon Geun-young), an ethnic Korean from China whom he presumes is a renowned, talented dancer. To his surprise, Young-sae learns Chae-ryn knows nothing about dancing and her soon-to-be married, older sister, Jang Chae-min, is the talented dancer. With only three months until the national dance championship, Young-sae trains Chae-ryn, vowing to turn her into a world-class dancer.

Cast
 Moon Geun-young as Jang Chae-min
 Park Gun-hyung as Na Young-sae
 Park Won-sang as Ma Sang-doo
 Yoon Chan as Jung Hyun-soo

Awards and nominations
2005 Grand Bell Awards
 Nomination – Best Actress – Moon Geun-young
 Nomination – Best New Actor – Park Gun-hyung
 Nomination – Best Costume Design – Lee Ji-young

2005 Blue Dragon Film Awards
 Nomination – Best New Actor – Park Gun-hyung

2005 Korean Film Awards
 Best New Actor – Park Gun-hyung

Critical reception
The film received mixed to negative reviews. Variety reviewer, Derek Elley favorably compared the film to Dance with the Wind, citing Moon Geun-young and Park Gun-hyung's performances, but wrote "the plot holds no water." Koreanfilm.org critic Tom Giammarco called the film "disappointing and cliche," and Darcy Paquet credited the film's box office success to Moon's celebrity status and noted that the ending was disappointing: "We never even really get to see the knock-em-dead dance sequence that you'd expect."

Remake
In 2015, Culture Cap Korea announced that it will co-produce a Chinese remake, which will cast a Chinese actor and a Korean actress. 60% of filming will take place in China, and 40% in Busan.

References

External links
 
 
 

2005 romantic comedy films
2005 films
2000s Korean-language films
2000s Mandarin-language films
2000s dance films
South Korean romantic comedy films
Ballroom dancing films
2005 multilingual films
South Korean multilingual films
2000s South Korean films